Pickin' on the Grateful Dead: A Tribute is a 1997 tribute album to the Grateful Dead consisting of thirteen of their songs replayed in a bluegrass style. It is a part of the Pickin' On… series.

Track listing 
 "Althea" (Robert Hunter/Jerry Garcia) - 5:31
 "Scarlet Begonias" (Hunter/Garcia) - 5:24
 "Friend of the Devil" (Hunter/Garcia/Dawson) - 4:25
 "Bird Song" (Hunter/Garcia) - 6:32
 "Truckin'" (Hunter/Garcia/Phil Lesh/Bob Weir) - 6:06
 "Lady with a Fan" (Hunter/Garcia) - 4:12
 "Casey Jones" (Hunter/Garcia) - 4:12
 "Samson and Delilah" (arrangement: David West) - 3:46
 "Touch of Grey" (Hunter/Garcia) - 6:02
 "Cumberland Blues" (Hunter/Garcia/Lesh) - 5:26
 "Ripple" (Hunter/Garcia) - 4:10
 "Goin' Down the Road Feelin' Bad" (arrangement: David West) - 3:59
 "Dark Star" (Hunter/Garcia) - 4:18

Personnel

 David West – Guitars, mandolin, banjo, bass, dobro, hammered dulcimer, percussion, background vocals
 Mike Mullins – Guitar, Mandolin
 Phil Salazar – Fiddles
 John Rosenburg – Piano
 Tom Ball – Harmonica
 Jody Eulitz – Drums
 Bill Flores – Pedal steel guitar
 Barney Tower – Electric guitar
 Pat Milliken – Guitars, mandolin
 Bo Fox – Percussion
 Kenny Sultan – Guitar
 Paul Lee – Fiddle
 David West – Producer, Engineer
 Recorded at – Studio "Z", Santa Barbara, California

References 

1997 albums
Grateful Dead tribute albums
Grateful Dead